Joan Cowell O'Meara Ridley (11 July 1903 – 4 October 1983) was a female British tennis player who was active in the 1920s and 1930s. Ridley was a semifinalist at the 1931 Wimbledon Championships where she lost in straight sets to Helen Jacobs.

Career
In 1928 Ridley won the Scottish Championships in 1928 and successfully defended her title in 1929. The same year her best Grand Slam result was reaching the final of the mixed doubles event at the 1929 Wimbledon Championships with compatriot Ian Collins, losing in three sets to the Americans Anna Harper and George Lott.

In 1930 she won the singles title at the British Covered Court Championships, played at the Queen's Club in London, after defeating Joan Fry in the final in straight sets. In 1929, she was runner-up at the same event to Peggy Saunders Michell. With Stanley Doust, she won the mixed doubles covered court title in 1926.

In 1932, she reached the semifinals at the U.S. Championships, losing in three sets to Carolin Babcock. 
In October 1932 and 1933, she won the tennis tournament in White Sulphur Springs, West Virginia. In 1931 and 1932 she reached the finals of the Middle States Championships, but lost on both occasions to Elsie Goldsack Pittman. In 1933 after two unsuccessful attempts she won the Middle States Championships against Alice Francis.

In October 1935, she married Daniel Joseph Patrick O'Meara, a gynaecologist. Her forehand was her favourite stroke.

Grand Slam finals

Mixed doubles: 1 runner-up

References

External links
National Portrait Gallery, Portraits of Joan Ridley

British female tennis players
1903 births
1985 deaths
English female tennis players
Tennis people from Suffolk